Zelenogorsk, officially known as Terijoki prior to 1948 (a name still used in Finnish and Swedish), is a municipal town in Kurortny District of the federal city of St. Petersburg, Russia, located in part of the Karelian Isthmus on the shore of the Gulf of Finland. Population: 

It has a station on the St. Petersburg-Vyborg railroad.

History

From 1323 to 1721 the Zelenogorsk area was a part of Sweden. It was ceded to Russia in 1721, becoming "Old Finland", which again was united with the Grand-Duchy of Finland in 1811. Until 1917, Terijoki was part of the Grand-Duchy of Finland, ruled by the Grand Dukes of Finland, who were the Tsars of Russia, (1812–1917).

Even though all of Finland was part of the Russian Empire, a customs border was located at Terijoki. A valid passport was needed for crossing the border between Russia and the Grand Duchy of Finland.

Vladimir Lenin managed to travel in secrecy over the internal border to Finland in 1907. Ten years later, in April 1917, he would return through the Terijoki border control at the head of the contingent of Bolshevik  exiles that had accompanied him from Switzerland.

With completion of the Riihimäki–Saint Petersburg railway in 1870, Terijoki become a popular summer resort, and was frequented by St. Petersburg's upper class until closure of the border during the Russian Revolution (1917).

When the Republic of Finland gained independence on 6 December 1917, Terijoki became a part of it, and remained so until it was occupied by the Soviet Union during the Winter War (1939-1940). It was regained by Finland in 1941 during the Continuation War (1941-1944), but was then occupied again by the Red Army during the later stages of the same war and annexed to the Soviet Union in 1944.

During the Winter War Terijoki become known as the seat of Otto Wille Kuusinen's Finnish Democratic Republic.

After the Second World War, its original Finnish population was expelled. They were relocated close to Helsinki and Soviet citizens were relocated to Terijoki. Around the start of the 21st century, the town's population was estimated to have been a few thousand, rising to above 50,000 in summer.

Contemporary times
As of the beginning of the 21st century, Zelenogorsk is actively developing in many directions. Various actions to improve the quality of life in Zelenogorsk and modernize the region have been undertaken.

July 25 is the date of the annually celebrated City Day. On this day in 2009, a fountain was opened in the central square of the city park, and a sculpture named "Boots of the Traveller" was solemnly unveiled along the central avenue.

At the Dachshund monument, parades of dachshunds have been held, and the museum of vintage vehicles has gained additional new exhibits.

At a concert in honor of City Day in 2009, known musicians performed, such as Music hall theatre of St. Petersburg, Edita Piekha, and others,

Notable people
Boris Smyslovsky, Russian general, émigré, and anti-communist.

Images

References

External links

Official website of Zelenogorsk 
Zelenogorsk Business Directory 

Cities and towns under jurisdiction of Saint Petersburg
Former municipalities of Finland
Karelian Isthmus
Kurortny District